Edward Hungerford (1875 – July 29, 1948) was an American journalist and author. His main interest was the railroad, about which he wrote many books and articles. He travelled extensively by rail and was a specialist in organizing railroad exhibitions.

Early life
Hungerford was born in Watertown, New York the son of Charles Anson Hungerford and his wife Cora Sill. He was a great great nephew of US Congressman Orville Hungerford. His parents operated a  grocery store in Watertown until 1892, when they became  owners of  the Woodruff House, a much larger store,  for 13 years. Hungerford was given a job there, running the elevator. He was educated at  Watertown High School, and was then sent to Williston Seminary in Easthampton, Massachusetts. He was a poor student and much of his childhood he spent watching trains on the Rome, Watertown and Ogdensburg Railroad. His father wanted him to become an architect and he enrolled in an architecture program at Syracuse University. However he abandoned his studies in Syracuse, and went to Western New York, where in 1896 he obtained a job  as a reporter with the Rochester Herald.

Journalism
After three years in Rochester, he obtained reporting and editing jobs with the Glens Falls Times, the Brooklyn Eagle, New York Evening Sun and the New York Herald. He continued writing, with the railroad industry becoming his main interest. For seven years he was  press representative for the Brooklyn Rapid Transit Company. He was also advertising manager for Wells Fargo & Company Express, and director of publications at the University of Rochester.

Railroad exhibitions
In 1925, Hungerford approached Daniel Willard, the president of the Baltimore and Ohio Railroad, and offered to write a history of the company, which was shortly to reach its centenary. Willard not only took up the suggestion, but also hired Hungerford to be the B&O's centennial director. Hungerford had seen a railroad celebration in England and created an extravagant exhibition at a park outside Baltimore. The "Fair of the Iron Horse"  opened on February 28, 1927, including displays and a two-hour play, Pageant of The Iron Horse. It drew crowds averaging 50,000 a day. "His success in Baltimore became his chief calling card," He  created five more transportation pageants during the 1930s including the Rochester Centennial of 1934, the Parade of the Years Pageant in 1936 in Cleveland; and lastly "Railroads on Parade". The railroad display at the fair, which lasted until 1940, presented steam, electric and diesel engines brought from Canada, England and  Italy. The attraction drew 2.6 million visitors during its two-year run.

Travel
Hungerford traveled annually more than 75,000 rail miles "just for the fun of it" and he calculated that over the years he had ridden more than 1.5 million miles on rails. He traveled occasionally to Europe and was in Italy in 1928 when he was received by Benito Mussolini.

Hungerford  continued to ride the rails, and while traveling in California in spring 1948 he was taken ill with an infection. His condition deteriorated on his train ride back to New York, where he was admitted to a hospital. He died at his home in New York City at the age of 72.

Family

Hungerford married  Bertha R. Harbottle (1881–1940). They had a daughter  Adrienna Hungerford Devereaux (1911–1955).

Works
Hungerford wrote two best selling books, Planning a Trip Abroad and With the Doughboy in France, a journal of experiences of World War I. Other works include
 The American book of church services
 The Genesee country & western New York...
 Locomotives on Parade
 The Modern Railroad
 Men of Erie, a story of human effort (1946)
 Railroads on Parade
 A Railroad for Tomorrow
 The romance of a great store
 The Run of the Twentieth Century
 The Story of the Baltimore and Ohio Railroad 1827-1927
 The Story of Louis Sherry and the business he built
 The Story of Public Utilities
 The story of the Rome. Watertown and Ogdensburgh railroad
 The story of the Waldorf-Astoria
 Transport for War
 Daniel WIllard rides the line: The Story of a Great Railroad man
 Wells Fargo: Advancing the American Frontier
 Early Railroads of New York (1932), in the journal New York History, 13(1).

During his career, Hungerford wrote for The Saturday Evening Post and Trains Magazine. He also wrote for Harper's Magazine between February 1909 and August 1921.

References

External links
 
 

1875 births
1948 deaths
People from Jefferson County, New York
American male writers